Saša Jovanović (born 15 December 1991) is a Serbian professional footballer who plays as a forward for TSC Bačka Topola.

Club career
Born in Lazarevac, Jovanović started out with his local side Kolubara. He played for his parent club for several seasons, before switching to Smederevo in mid-2013. Between 2014 and 2017, Jovanović made a name for himself at Mladost Lučani. He amassed 96 appearances and scored 23 goals in the top flight, helping them earn a spot in the 2017–18 UEFA Europa League. In August 2017, Jovanović was transferred to Spanish club Córdoba.

On 22 January 2019, Saudi club Al-Fateh SC reached an agreement with Córdoba for the transfer of Jovanović. On 2 September, he returned to Spain and its second division, after signing for Deportivo de La Coruña on a one-year loan deal.

International career
Jovanović was capped twice for Serbia in 2016 and 2017, in friendlies against Qatar and USA.

References

External links
 
 
 
 
 

1991 births
Living people
Footballers from Belgrade
Serbian footballers
Association football forwards
Serbian First League players
Serbian SuperLiga players
FK Kolubara players
FK Mladost Lučani players
FK Smederevo players
Segunda División players
Córdoba CF players
Deportivo de La Coruña players
Saudi Professional League players
Al-Fateh SC players
Serbia international footballers
Serbian expatriate footballers
Serbian expatriate sportspeople in Spain
Serbian expatriate sportspeople in Saudi Arabia
Expatriate footballers in Spain
Expatriate footballers in Saudi Arabia